Heliophanus innominatus is a jumping spider species in the genus Heliophanus.  It was first described by Wanda Wesołowska in 1986 and lives in Madagascar.

References

Spiders described in 1986
Salticidae
Spiders of Madagascar
Taxa named by Wanda Wesołowska